{{infobox film
| image          = 
| caption        = Journey of an African Colony
| director       = BB Sasore
| producer       = 
| writer         = 
| screenplay     = 
| story          = 
| based_on       = A Platter of Gold: Making Nigeria
Possessed: A History of Law & Justice in the Crown Colony of Lagos 1861–1906The King and the Colony for Journey of an African Colony| starring       = 
| narrator       = Olasupo Shasore
| music          = 
| cinematography = 
| editing        = 
| studio         = Quramo Production
| distributor    = 
| released       = 
| country        = Nigeria
| language       = 
| budget         = 
| gross          = 
}}Journey of an African Colony, The Making of Nigeria is a seven-episode Nigerian film documentary series. It was released on Netflix on the 60th anniversary of Nigeria's independence. The film series is based on two books — Possessed: A History of Law & Justice in the Crown Colony of Lagos 1861–1906 and A Platter of Gold: Making Nigeria — by retired attorney general and commissioner for justice in Lagos State, Olasupo Shasore. It is narrated and produced by Shashore. The series overviews the history of colonization, the slave trade,  and independence in Nigeria.

Shasore travelled Nigeria for the film which has an  emphasis on the slave era, pre-colonialism, and independence. While there are archives that contain a comprehensive history of the country, there are hardly any films with detailed narrative like Journey of an African Colony.Journey of an African Colony: The Making of Nigeria is a seven-episode docuseries, each half an hour long. Journey of an African Colony'' did a brief run on television in 2019 because Shasore wanted to make sure it was seen in Nigeria before it aired internationally.

The film series was directed by BB Shashore, with sound design by Kulanen Ikyo and cinematography by Ola Cardoso.

References 

Documentaries about historical events
Documentary films about Lagos
Documentary films about Nigeria
History of Nigeria
Netflix original documentary films